Ralph Fertig (February 24, 1930 – March 28, 2019) was an American social justice activist, lawyer, educator and author who in 1973 was described by the Washington Post as, the "conscience of Washington, D.C." When he died in 2020, The Los Angeles Times said he was "the conscience of L.A.".

Early life and education
Ralph David Fertig was born on February 24, 1930, in Chicago, Illinois. He graduated from the University of Chicago then Columbia University with undergraduate and Master's degrees in Social Work, and about twenty years later (in 1979) Fertig graduated from the UCLA School of Law and became an attorney.

Career
Fertig became an anti-segregationist activist early in his life in Chicago, and eventually became active throughout the country, including the Southern United States, and he played an organizing and leading role among civil rights activists, including the Freedom Riders. He was arrested, severely beaten and jailed for his activism in Selma, Alabama in 1961. He helped organize the March on Washington for Jobs and Freedom on August 28, 1963. He was a community organizer and first Executive Director of the Southeast Neighborhood House in Anacostia, D.C., then later became Executive Director of the Washington Metropolitan Planning and Housing Association until 1973, when he moved to Los Angeles, California.

As the new Executive director of the Greater Los Angeles Community Action Agency, which oversaw the distribution of hundreds of millions of dollars each year to organizations working in communities on issues of antipoverty, job training, child care, education, community development, etc, Fertig encountered an agency riven with corruption.  His efforts to eliminate corruption led then-police chief Ed Davis to order Fertig and other staff to wear bullet-proof vests (provided by the LAPD) to work.

Eventually, at Fertig's urging, Mike Wallace and his "60 Minutes" crew came to Los Angeles and produced a segment revealing the corruption, which helped end it.  Ralph Fertig then resigned with honor and entered UCLA Law School.  Upon graduation, Fertig practiced law, for unions, plaintiffs and progressive organizations.  He soon focused to specialize in civil rights cases. He became a trial counsel at the L.A. office of the EEOC Equal Employment Opportunity Commission (EEOC) and later served as a federal administrative judge for the Los Angeles EEOC. He was the executive director of the Greater Los Angeles Community Action Agency, and a president of the Humanitarian Law Project. He wrote a best-selling novel, Love and Liberation. From 2003 to 2016, he taught Social Justice at the University of Southern California, and he (co-)authored books about social justice.

Personal life and death
Fertig was married three times; he had two sons, Jack and David, and three daughters, Katie, Karen & Jill (Karen and Jill were Marj's daughter from her previous marriage.) Divorced from his first wife Ann in 1968, His second wife, Marjorie Hays Fertig, died in 2002. His third wife, Madaleine Stoner, died in 2008. Fertig resided in Westwood, and in his later years he attended the University Synagogue, then Leo Baeck Temple in Bel Air. He died of Parkinson’s disease on March 28, 2019 in Los Angeles, at 89.

Selected works

References

1930 births
2019 deaths
People from Westwood, Los Angeles
Columbia Graduate School of Arts and Sciences alumni
University of Chicago alumni
UCLA School of Law alumni
University of Southern California faculty
Activists from California
American social justice activists
Deaths from Parkinson's disease
Neurological disease deaths in California